A strap, sometimes also called strop, is an elongated flap or ribbon, usually of leather or other flexible materials.

Thin straps are used as part of clothing or baggage, or bedding such as a sleeping bag. See for example spaghetti strap, shoulder strap. A strap differs from a belt mainly in that a strap is usually integral to the item of clothing; either can be used in combination with buckles.

Straps are also used as fasteners to attach, secure, carry, or bind items, to objects, animals (for example a saddle on a horse) and people (for example a watch on a wrist), or even to tie down people and animals, as on an apparatus for corporal punishment. Occasionally a strap is specified after what it binds or holds, e.g. chin strap. Webbing is a particular type of strap that is a strong fabric woven as a flat strip or tube that is also often used in place of rope. Modern webbing is typically made from exceptionally high-strength material and is used in automobile seat belts, furniture manufacturing, transportation, towing, military uniform, cargo fasteners, and many other fields.

Components 
 Strap loop
 Strap union
 Strap fitting

Packaging

The strap is commonly used in the packaging industry to secure or fasten items. It may be made from a wide range of materials, such as plastic, steel, paper, or fabric. Usually, the strap is secured to itself through various means, but it may also be secured to other items, such as pallets.

Gallery

See also
Buckle
 Drawstring
 Watch strap
 Phone strap
Snap fastener
 Strapping (punishment)
Hook and loop fastener

References

External links

Parts of clothing
Textile closures

fr:Strap
pl:Rzemień